Garima Arora is an Indian chef. In November 2018, she became the first Indian woman to win a Michelin star.

Early life and career  
Arora grew up in Mumbai, and is of Punjabi Arora family. She initially pursued a career in journalism before becoming a chef. 

In 2008, she left for France. She studied at Le Cordon Bleu in Paris and graduated in 2010. She worked with Chef Gaggan Anand , Gordon Ramsay and René Redzepi of Noma in Copenhagen before opening her own restaurant, Gaa, in Bangkok in April 2017. Gaa is a three-storey restaurant that celebrates a modern tasting menu using traditional Indian techniques. 

In November 2018, she and her restaurant were awarded a Michelin star, with Arora being the first female Indian chef to receive the distinction. In March 2019, Restaurant Gaa made its debut on the Asia's 50 Best Restaurants list at No. 16, claiming the Highest New Entry Award. 

In February 2019, Arora was named Asia's Best Female Chef for the year by World's 50 Best Restaurants.

In June 2019, Restaurant Gaa made its debut on the World's 50 Best Restaurants list at No. 95.

In August 2019, Arora launched Food Forward India, an initiative prioritizing the future of Indian food. The inaugural event, which took place in Mumbai on 17 October, 2019, brought together Mumbai's brightest minds in the Indian food community to engage in a day filled with talks, food tastings and panel discussions. She is one of the judges in Master chef India. (2023)

References 

Indian chefs
Women chefs
Alumni of Le Cordon Bleu
1986 births

Living people
People from Mumbai